Greer Stevens (born 15 February 1957) is a retired professional tennis player from South Africa.

Career
Stevens in 1980 reached a career high singles ranking of world No. 7 and the Wimbledon quarterfinals in both singles and doubles]. With Bob Hewitt, she won the mixed doubles event at Wimbledon in 1977 and 1979 and at the US Open in 1979. She also played for the Boston Lobsters of World TeamTennis. She retired in December 1980 after competing in the New South Wales Open, having had her career best year.

Grand Slam finals

Mixed doubles: 3 (3 titles)

WTA Tour finals

Singles: 6 (4–2)

Doubles: 17 (5–12)

Grand Slam singles tournament timeline

Note: The Australian Open was held twice in 1977, in January and December.

References

External links
 
 
 

South African female tennis players
1957 births
Living people
Grand Slam (tennis) champions in mixed doubles
Sportspeople from Pietermaritzburg
Wimbledon champions
US Open (tennis) champions